Valle del Guadiato  is an official comarca (county) in Andalusia, southern Spain.

Located in the Sierra Morena region, it is named after the Guadiato River.

External links 
Official  website 

Comarcas of Andalusia